The vessel MV Blythe Star was a coastal freighter which foundered off south-western Tasmania in October 1973, leading to the largest maritime search operation conducted in Australia to that time. No sign of the vessel was ever found. The crew of ten successfully took to a small inflatable liferaft, but it was not until after 11 days and the deaths of three seamen that the survivors were found ashore in rugged terrain near Deep Glen Bay on Tasmania's south east coast. As a result of this tragedy, the AUSREP maritime position reporting system was introduced to the Australian Navigation Act.

Vessel history
The MV Blythe Star was the second vessel to be operated with this name in Tasmania during the mid-twentieth century. The first, commonly referred to as the Blythe Star I, itself was lost after an engine room fire in the late 1950s.

The MV Blythe Star (II) was a small freighter vessel of 371 gross tons, built by Ateliers Ducheans and Bossiere at Le Havre France in 1955, for owners Rederi A/S Orion of Drammen Norway. Originally called Tandik, the vessel was purchased by the Bass Strait Shipping Company in 1960 and renamed Blythe Star.

Records indicate that while in Australia it operated as a coastal freighter around Tasmania and surrounding islands, along with cross-Bass Strait voyages to mainland Australia and around its coasts.

Last voyage
On 12 October 1973, the Blythe Star left Prince of Wales Bay, Hobart, Tasmania bound for Currie on King Island, located in Bass Strait. Its cargo comprised superphosphate fertilizer, believed to be in stacked bags on pallets, and a ton of beer in kegs. Sea conditions were reported as calm with a soft rolling swell.

Shortly after leaving Hobart, the vessel turned to starboard and set a course to King Island around the western side of Tasmania. By the next morning, with the weather and sea conditions still good, the vessel was a short distance off South West Cape when, between 8:00am and 8:30am, a sudden list developed to starboard. After briefly stabilising, the list quickly increased until much of the starboard side was below the waterline and seawater began entering the vessel through unsecured openings. Those crew members asleep below decks were thrown from their bunks, and all the crew struggled to make their way through rising water to the rear deck area. The capsize appears to have been completely unexpected by the crew, with the captain later quoted as saying:
"All seemed well, with nothing out of the ordinary. It was fine weather - beautiful weather. Suddenly there was a lurch. I thought "That's funny". Next thing I knew she was lying over on her starboard side".

The ship's lifeboat was unable to be launched due to the extreme list angle; however, an inflatable liferaft was released into the sea by the bosun Stan Leary. Once inflated by its gas canister, the crew all managed to board it and it was cut free of the ship by young crewmember Michael Doleman. Very shortly after, the Blythe Star'''s bow lifted high and it sank stern-first into the Southern Ocean, approximately five miles west of South West Cape in 80 fathoms (480 feet; 150 metres) of water. No distress call had been made by the captain at the time of the sinking.

Crew survival
In the rush to abandon ship, the emergency radio had been left on board the Blythe Star, however the crew expected to be quickly spotted by searchers or passing ships. This was not to be, and by several days into their ordeal the weather had worsened significantly. Keeping the raft upright and afloat took much effort, with big waves regularly collapsing the inflatable vessel onto itself, and water needing to be constantly bailed-out.

Over the ensuing days, the raft drifted south-eastward around the south of Tasmania, increasingly distant from land. After three days of worsening conditions, John Sloan the Second Engineer died, possibly due to a lack of his normal medication, and he was buried at sea the next evening. A welcome weather change then carried them north as far as Schouten Island off the Freycinet Peninsula, following which the raft drifted south-westerly approximately parallel to Tasmania's eastern coastline. On the ninth day, they came close to a small rocky bay and the crew successfully made landfall on the Forestier Peninsula at Deep Glen Bay.

Almost immediately the nine survivors attempted to find an overland way out of the bay. The steep, precipitous cliffs and almost impenetrable vegetation made any progress exhausting, and within a short period another two crewmen, John Eagles and Ken Jones, died of suspected privations, exhaustion and hypothermia. Eventually, the small group of Michael Doleman, Malcolm McCarroll and Alfred Simpson set out together and over the next day and night managed to scale the cliffs and force their way through the rainforest until they came to a rough track on 26 October. Amazingly, a vehicle was heard approaching almost immediately, believed to be a local forester Mr Rod Smith. The three were taken to the nearby township of Dunalley where a helicopter was quickly arranged to collect the remaining four crew members from Deep Glen Bay. All seven survivors recovered following some time in hospital.

Search operations
With the port of departure Hobart being located in Tasmania's south-east, two possible routes existed for a voyage to King Island located off Tasmania's north-west corner: around the western side of Tasmania, or up the eastern coast. Unfortunately for all concerned, no notice had been left by the Blythe Star as to which direction the vessel would take, and this immediately compromised the efficiency of the search operation that was launched on 15 October when she failed to arrive at King Island and there had been no radio contact.

The preliminary search conducted by light aircraft (on the 16 October a HS748 - A10-608 - was despatched from RAAF East Sale, designated as the first search aircraft, to circumnavigate Tasmania in search) was followed on 17 October by a major air search employing nine military aircraft, coordinated by the Marine Operations Centre in Canberra, ACT. After seven days of searching, it was decided to call-off the full-scale search after nothing apart from some minor flotsam unrelated to the Blythe Star was found.

Despite the most extensive air-sea search yet conducted in Australia, no trace of the vessel could be found. Parliamentary records note that the search was a large operation with a total of 14 aircraft involved. The cost was noted as over AUD$250,000 in 1973, utilising equipment worth many tens of millions of dollars.

Official investigations ceased on 23 October 1973 after no sign of the vessel, debris or crew had been found.

Reports and recommendations
A Ministerial Statement was made in the Australian House of Representatives on 24 October 1973 by Mr Charles Jones, Minister for Transport, upon receipt of the news that the missing crewmen had been found. A preliminary investigation was announced, along with a subsequent wide-ranging inquiry.

A motion was moved in the Australian Parliament on 11 November 1973 by Mr William Charles Wenthworth MHR, to appoint a committee to investigate the circumstances of why the liferaft and survivors were not located by the search, and to consider measures to facilitate the better location of distressed vessels in future. An extract from his speech included the following description of the drifting lifeboat:
This is an incredible story because there was mounted a large and expensive search with all the technical facilities at our command. Yet this raft, starting from the most probable point where the vessel would have sunk, passing by lighthouses and coast watchers, through fishing vessels, near other vessels, across the mouth of the Derwent River that runs into Hobart, past another lighthouse within a few hundred yards, and within sighting distance of a tourist hotel, still was not located and was given up for lost. I think the House will agree with me that this is a most extraordinary chain of events.
This motion was subsequently withdrawn in recognition of the Court of Marine Inquiry announced by the Government to start later that year by Justice Dunphy. This judicial inquiry followed an earlier preliminary investigation headed by a Captain Taylor. The court of inquiry was held at Melbourne between 3 December 1973 and 14 February 1974; virtually none of those involved in the vessel's operations, or in the search that commenced after she was reported missing, escaped criticism.

A forensic report "Loss of MV Blythe Star" was published by R. J. Herd in January 1974, possibly as part of the Court of Inquiry being conducted at that time, with its findings summarised in The Australian Naval Architect journal of August 1999. Herd concludes that while there was no evidence that the vessel was overloaded or incorrectly loaded, it seems likely that manipulation of the vessel's ballast tanks shortly before the capsize, possibly inadvertently, fatally impaired the ship's stability given the configuration of its loading. In the scenario postulated, one of the main ballast tanks in the vessel's double-bottomed hull may have been drained to the level where a broad free water surface was created low down in the ship, and this would significantly compromise the vessel's rolling stability. Due to the loss of the crew members most knowledgeable about these operations, such conclusions can only be speculative and are primarily based upon forensic calculations.

Crew on last voyage

Memorial

The plaque contains the following text:

M.V. "Blythe Star"

Foundered en-route with cargo from
Hobart to Port of Grassy, King Island.
Capsized 13.10.1973. Crew of 10 took
to liferaft, drifting until 22.10.1973.
Landfall made at Deep Glen Bay, S.E. Tas.
J.Sloan 2nd engineer died 18.10.1973
J.Eagles Chief Engineer died 21/22.10.1973
K.Jones Chief Officer died 22.10.1973

~ Enduring courage honoured ~

References

See also 
 Shipwrecks of Tasmania
 Shipwrecks of Australia

1955 ships
Ships built in France
Merchant ships of Norway
Merchant ships of Australia
Maritime incidents in 1973
Shipwrecks of Tasmania